Servio is a San Francisco based technology company that provides enterprise content services. It was founded by Alex Edelstein and Jordan Ritter in 2009, and originally called CloudCrowd. The CloudCrowd brand continues to be used by the company as its online workspace. and uses crowdsourcing concepts. Servio was acquired by CrowdSource  in December, 2013.

Products

Content Creation
Servio creates unique content, including retail product descriptions, health content, and articles.

Content & Page Optimization
Servio carries out at-scale optimization of existing content, including rewriting, title tag creation, keyword research, interlinking, and image location.

Customers
Customers include Target, eBay, Healthline, Walmart, and Coca-Cola.

People
Servio was founded by Alex Edelstein and Jordan Ritter.

References

External links 
Servio
CloudCrowd

Crowdsourcing
Outsourcing companies